This page lists the World Best Year Performance in the year 2003 in both the men's and the women's hammer throw. The main event during this season were the 2003 World Athletics Championships in Paris, France, where the final of the men's competition was held on Tuesday August 25, 2003. The women had their final three days later, on Thursday August 28, 2003.

Men

Records

2003 World Year Ranking

Women

Records

2003 World Year Ranking

References
IAAF
tilastopaja
apulanta
apulanta
hammerthrow.eu

2003
Hammer Throw Year Ranking, 2003